Operation Goldeneye was an Allied stay-behind plan during the Second World War to monitor Spain after a possible alliance between Francisco Franco and the Axis powers, and to undertake sabotage operations.  The plan was formed by Commander Ian Fleming of the Naval Intelligence Division (NID). No German takeover of Spain took place, nor an invasion of Gibraltar, and the plan was shelved in 1943. Fleming later used the name for his Jamaican home where he wrote the James Bond stories.

Background

The aim of the operation was to ensure that Britain could continue to communicate with Gibraltar if Spain joined, or was invaded by, the Axis powers, and to carry out limited sabotage. In August 1940, Lieutenant Commander Ian Fleming of the NID was assigned the responsibility for drawing up the plan. Of particular concern to Fleming was the possible installation of Axis radar equipment and infrared cameras in the Strait of Gibraltar, which would have been a threat to the Navy's Mediterranean strategy and to Allied shipping interests in the Atlantic Ocean.

Under cover of a courier's passport, Fleming travelled to Gibraltar on 16 February 1941. On his arrival, he liaised closely with Alan Hillgarth, the British naval attaché in Madrid. Hillgarth provided much of the background to the plan for the guerrilla campaign and sabotage that would follow German presence on the Iberian peninsula. Fleming's presence in Gibraltar was primarily to set up a secure cipher link between London and the Goldeneye liaison office, the latter under the control of H. L. Greensleeves, an NID agent. A Tangier office was also set up by Fleming to assume the activities of the Gibraltar office should the Germans occupy Gibraltar. During the course of his visit, Fleming also met with William J. Donovan from the American Office of Strategic Services, who was on a fact-finding tour. Fleming returned to London on 26 February 1941.

A precursor to visiting the US, Fleming discussed Goldeneye with the various intelligence organisations in Lisbon on 20 May 1941, to ensure their smooth coordinated operations. He also undertook an assessment of the facilities and equipment for Goldeneye. He suggested that an Anglo-American Intelligence Committee be set up to coordinate the gathering and evaluating of intelligence from North Africa and the Iberian peninsula.

In 1942 Goldeneye moved into a state of alert prior to the implementation of Operation Torch, the Allied invasion of North Africa, to monitor and counter the stepped up surveillance and sabotage activities by the Axis powers who suspected that some type of military action would occur in the Mediterranean area. The 10th Light Flotilla, an elite unit of Italian navy frogmen, would use wrecked ships in Gibraltar to launch attacks on Allied shipping.

The reduced risk of Nazi occupation of Spain brought about the shutdown of Goldeneye in August 1943, along with the associated plan, Operation Tracer.

Post-war legacy

Fleming later dubbed his Jamaican estate "Goldeneye", and began writing his series of James Bond novels there. The name was also used for the title of the seventeenth James Bond film, GoldenEye starring Pierce Brosnan as Bond.

Notes and references 
Notes

References

Bibliography 
 
 
 
 

 
 
 
 

1940 establishments in the United Kingdom
1943 disestablishments in the United Kingdom
Cancelled military operations of World War II
Gibraltar in World War II
Operation Goldeneye
Operation Goldeneye
Intelligence operations
Non-combat military operations
Spain in World War II
Spain–United Kingdom military relations
World War II deception operations
World War II espionage